Biobessa beatrix is a species of beetle in the family Cerambycidae. It was described by Gahan in 1898. It is known from Kenya, Ethiopia, Tanzania and Somalia.

References

Crossotini
Beetles described in 1898